
Broad Hinton and Winterbourne Bassett is a parish council area comprising the adjacent civil parishes of Broad Hinton and Winterbourne Bassett, in the English county of Wiltshire.

The two civil parishes elect a single grouped parish council. They fall within the area of the Wiltshire Council unitary authority, which is responsible for almost all significant local government functions.

In the census of 2011, the combined population of the parishes was 809.

See also
List of civil parishes in Wiltshire

Sources
Kennet District Council Website page on Broad Hinton and Winterbourne Bassett Parish, retrieved 5 October 2004
Office for National Statistics (ONS) – List of English parishes, retrieved 3 October 2004

References

Local government in Wiltshire